Hulki Saner (14 February 1923 – 20 July 2005) was a Turkish film director, screenwriter and producer.  He contributed to more than one hundred films from 1957 to 1987 and is known for directing the Turist Ömer film series.

References

External links 

1923 births
2005 deaths
Turkish film directors
Turkish film producers
Comedy film directors
Parody film directors
Turkish parodists